Damon Fox is a Los Angeles multi-instrumentalist/songwriter/producer. He is primarily recognized as the lead singer, keyboardist of the psychedelic prog metal outfit Bigelf. He can be heard on several platinum albums, including Alicia Keys’ As I Am and Christina Aguilera's Stripped and Back To Basics. Damon’s keyboards also appear on releases from Matt Sorum (Guns & Roses), Cheap Trick, and Courtney Love. Since 2016, he is a touring musician with the British rock band The Cult, and continues to tour worldwide with Bigelf.
Fox made a guest appearance on season six of RuPaul's Drag Race for one challenge. The episode’s challenge was for the competing queens to makeover straight men as brides. The brides appeared on the behind the scenes show ‘Untucked’ with their spouses dresses as grooms. Fox’s makeover was performed by drag fan favorite Darienne Lake.

Discography

References

External links
 
 Bigelf Official Website
 The Cult Official Website

American rock guitarists
American rock keyboardists
Living people
21st-century American keyboardists 
Year of birth missing (living people)